Troponin, or the troponin complex, is a complex of three regulatory proteins (troponin C, troponin I, and troponin T) that are integral to muscle contraction in skeletal muscle and cardiac muscle, but not smooth muscle. Measurements of cardiac-specific troponins I and T are extensively used as diagnostic and prognostic indicators in the management of myocardial infarction and acute coronary syndrome. Blood troponin levels may be used as a diagnostic marker for stroke or other myocardial injury that is ongoing, although the sensitivity of this measurement is low.

Function
Troponin is attached to the protein tropomyosin and lies within the groove between actin filaments in muscle tissue.  In a relaxed muscle, tropomyosin blocks the attachment site for the myosin crossbridge, thus preventing contraction.  When the muscle cell is stimulated to contract by an action potential, calcium channels open in the sarcoplasmic membrane and release calcium into the sarcoplasm.  Some of this calcium attaches to troponin, which causes it to change shape, exposing binding sites for myosin (active sites) on the actin filaments.  Myosin's binding to actin causes crossbridge formation, and contraction of the muscle begins.

Troponin is found in both skeletal muscle and cardiac muscle, but the specific versions of troponin differ between types of muscle. The main difference is that the TnC subunit of troponin in skeletal muscle has four calcium ion-binding sites, whereas in cardiac muscle there are only three. The actual amount of calcium that binds to troponin has not been definitively established.

Physiology
In both cardiac and skeletal muscles, muscular force production is controlled primarily by changes in the intracellular calcium concentration. In general, when calcium rises, the muscles contract and, when calcium falls, the muscles relax.

Troponin is a component of thin filaments (along with actin and tropomyosin), and is the protein complex to which calcium binds to trigger the production of muscular force. Troponin itself has three subunits, TnC, TnI, and TnT, each playing a role in force regulation . Under resting intracellular levels of calcium, tropomyosin covers the active sites on actin to which myosin (a molecular motor organized in muscle thick filaments) binds in order to generate force. When calcium becomes bound to specific sites in the N-domain of TnC, a series of protein structural changes occurs such that tropomyosin is rolled away from myosin-binding sites on actin, allowing myosin to attach to the thin filament and produce force and shorten the sarcomere.

Individual subunits serve different functions:

 Troponin C binds to calcium ions to produce a conformational change in TnI
 Troponin T binds to tropomyosin, interlocking them to form a troponin-tropomyosin complex
 Troponin I binds to actin in thin myofilaments to hold the actin-tropomyosin complex in place

Smooth muscle does not have troponin.

Subunits
TnT is a tropomyosin-binding subunit which regulates the interaction of troponin complex with thin filaments; TnI inhibits ATP-ase activity of acto-myosin; TnC is a Ca2+-binding subunit, playing the main role in Ca2+ dependent regulation of muscle contraction.

TnT and TnI in cardiac muscle are presented by forms different from those in skeletal muscles. Two isoforms of TnI and two isoforms of TnT are expressed in human skeletal muscle tissue (skTnI and skTnT). Only one tissue-specific isoform of TnI is described for cardiac muscle tissue (cTnI), whereas the existence of several cardiac specific isoforms of TnT (cTnT) are described in the literature. No cardiac specific isoforms are known for human TnC. TnC in human cardiac muscle tissue is presented by an isoform typical for slow skeletal muscle. Another form of TnC, fast skeletal TnC isoform, is more typical for fast skeletal muscles. cTnI is expressed only in myocardium. No examples of cTnI expression in healthy or injured skeletal muscle or in other tissue types are known. cTnT is probably less cardiac specific. Expression of cTnT in skeletal tissue of patients with chronic skeletal muscle injuries has been described.

Inside the cardiac troponin complex the strongest interaction between molecules has been demonstrated for cTnI – TnC binary complex especially in the presence of Ca2+ ( KA = 1.510−8 M−1). TnC, forming a complex with cTnI, changes the conformation of cTnI molecule and shields part of its surface. According to the latest data cTnI is released in the blood stream of the patient in the form of binary complex with TnC or ternary complex with cTnT and TnC. cTnI-TnC complex formation plays an important positive role in improving the stability of cTnI molecule. cTnI, which is extremely unstable in its free form, demonstrates significantly better stability in complex  with TnC or in ternary cTnI-cTnT-TnC complex. It has been demonstrated that stability of cTnI in native complex is significantly better than stability of the purified form of the protein or the stability of cTnI in artificial troponin complexes combined from purified proteins.

Research

Cardiac conditions
Certain subtypes of troponin (cardiac I and T) are sensitive and specific indicators of damage to the heart muscle (myocardium). They are measured in the blood to differentiate between unstable angina and myocardial infarction (heart attack) in people with chest pain or acute coronary syndrome. A person who recently had a myocardial infarction would have an area of damaged heart muscle and elevated cardiac troponin levels in the blood. This can also occur in people with coronary vasospasm, a type of myocardial infarction involving severe constriction of the cardiac blood vessels. After a myocardial infarction troponins may remain high for up to 2 weeks.

Cardiac troponins are a marker of all heart muscle damage, not just myocardial infarction, which is the most severe form of heart disorder. However, diagnostic criteria for raised troponin indicating myocardial infarction is currently set by the WHO at a threshold of 2 μg or higher. Critical levels of other cardiac  biomarkers are also relevant, such as creatine kinase. Other conditions that directly or indirectly lead to heart muscle damage and death can also increase troponin levels, such as kidney failure. Severe tachycardia (for example due to supraventricular tachycardia) in an individual with normal coronary arteries can also lead to increased troponins for example, it is presumed due to increased oxygen demand and inadequate supply to the heart muscle.

Troponins are also increased in patients with heart failure, where they also predict mortality and ventricular rhythm abnormalities. They can rise in inflammatory conditions such as myocarditis and pericarditis with heart muscle involvement (which is then termed myopericarditis). Troponins can also indicate several forms of cardiomyopathy, such as dilated cardiomyopathy, hypertrophic cardiomyopathy or (left) ventricular hypertrophy, peripartum cardiomyopathy, Takotsubo cardiomyopathy, or infiltrative disorders such as cardiac amyloidosis.

Heart injury with increased troponins also occurs in cardiac contusion, defibrillation and internal or external cardioversion. Troponins are commonly increased in several procedures such as cardiac surgery and heart transplantation, closure of atrial septal defects, percutaneous coronary intervention, or radiofrequency ablation.

Non-cardiac conditions
The distinction between cardiac and non-cardiac conditions is somewhat artificial; the conditions listed below are not primary heart diseases, but they exert indirect effects on the heart muscle.

Troponins are increased in around 40% of patients with critical illnesses such as sepsis. There is an increased risk of mortality and length of stay in the intensive-care unit in these patients. In severe gastrointestinal bleeding, there can also be a mismatch between oxygen demand and supply of the myocardium.

Chemotherapy agents can exert toxic effects on the heart (examples include anthracycline, cyclophosphamide, 5-fluorouracil, and cisplatin). Several toxins and venoms can also lead to heart muscle injury (scorpion venom, snake venom, and venom from jellyfish and centipedes). Carbon monoxide poisoning or cyanide poisoning can also be accompanied by release of troponins due to hypoxic cardiotoxic effects. Cardiac injury occurs in about one-third of severe CO poisoning cases, and troponin screening is appropriate in these patients.

In both primary pulmonary hypertension, pulmonary embolism, and acute exacerbations of chronic obstructive pulmonary disease (COPD), right ventricular strain results in increased wall tension and may cause ischemia. Of course, patients with COPD exacerbations might also have concurrent myocardial infarction or pulmonary embolism, so care has to be taken to attribute increased troponin levels to COPD.

People with end-stage kidney disease can have chronically elevated troponin T levels, which are linked to a poorer prognosis. Troponin I is less likely to be falsely elevated.

Strenuous endurance exercise such as marathons or triathlons can lead to increased troponin levels in up to one-third of subjects, but it is not linked to adverse health effects in these competitors.
High troponin T levels have also been reported in patients with inflammatory muscle diseases such as polymyositis or dermatomyositis. Troponins are also increased in rhabdomyolysis.

In hypertensive disorders of pregnancy such as preeclampsia, elevated troponin levels indicate some degree of myofibrillary damage.

Cardiac troponin T and I can be used to monitor drug and toxin-induced cardiomyocyte toxicity. .

In 2020, it was found that patients with severe COVID-19 had higher troponin I levels compared to those with milder disease.

Prognostic use
Elevated troponin levels are prognostically important in many of the conditions in which they are used for diagnosis.

In a community-based cohort study indicating the importance of silent cardiac damage, troponin I has been shown to predict mortality and first coronary heart disease event in men free from cardiovascular disease at baseline. In people with stroke, elevated blood troponin levels are not a useful marker to detect the condition.

Subunits
First cTnI and later cTnT were originally used as markers for cardiac cell death. Both proteins are now widely used to diagnose acute myocardial infarction (AMI), unstable angina, post-surgery myocardium trauma and some other related diseases with cardiac muscle injury. Both markers can be detected in patient's blood 3–6 hours after onset of the chest pain, reaching peak level within 16–30 hours. Elevated concentration of cTnI and cTnT in blood samples can be detected even 5–8 days after onset of the symptoms, making both proteins useful also for the late diagnosis of AMI.

Detection
Cardiac troponin T and I are measured by immunoassay methods.

 Due to patent regulations, a single manufacturer (Roche Diagnostics) distributes cTnT.
 A host of diagnostic companies make cTnI immunoassay methods available on many different immunoassay platforms.

Troponin elevation following cardiac cell necrosis starts within 2–3 hours, peaks in approx. 24 hours, and persists for 1–2 weeks.

See also
 Calcium-binding protein
 Troponin C
 Troponin I
 Troponin T

References

External links
 
 Troponins at Lab Tests Online

 
Muscular system